The men's middleweight (75 kilograms) event at the 2018 Asian Games took place from 25 August to 1 September  2018 at Jakarta International Expo Hall, Jakarta, Indonesia.

Schedule
All times are Western Indonesia Time (UTC+07:00)

Results 
Legend
RSC — Won by referee stop contest
WO — Won by walkover

Final

Top half

Bottom half

References

External links
Official website

Boxing at the 2018 Asian Games